The Dean of Durham is the "head" (primus inter pares – first among equals) and chair of the Chapter, the ruling body of Durham Cathedral. The dean and chapter are based at the Cathedral Church of Christ, Blessed Mary the Virgin and St Cuthbert of Durham in Durham. The cathedral is the mother church of the Diocese of Durham and seat of the Bishop of Durham.

List of deans

Early modern
1541–1551 Hugh Whitehead (last prior)
1551–1553 Robert Horne
1553–1558 Thomas Watson
1558–1559 Thomas Robertson (deprived) 
1559–1561 Robert Horne (again)
1561–1563 Ralph Skinner
1563–1579 William Whittingham
1580–1581 Thomas Wilson (Lay dean)
1583–1595 Tobias Matthew
1596–1606 William James
1606–1620 Adam Newton (Lay dean)
1620–1638 Richard Hunt
1639–1645 Walter Balcanquhall
1646 Christopher Potter
1646–1659 William Fuller
1660–1661 John Barwick 
1661–1684 John Sudbury
1684–1690 Denis Granville 
1691–1699 Thomas Comber 
1700–1728 John Montague 

1728–1746 Henry Bland
1746–1774 The Hon Spencer Cowper
1774–1777 Thomas Dampier
1777–1788 William Digby
1788–1794 John Hinchliffe

Late modern
1794–1824 The Hon James Cornwallis
(The Earl Cornwallis from 1823)
1824–1827 Charles Hall 
1827–1840 John Jenkinson  
1840–1869 George Waddington
1869–1894 William Lake (also Warden of the University)
1894–1912 George Kitchin
1912–1918 Hensley Henson
1918–1933 James Welldon
1933–1951 Cyril Alington
1951–1974 John Wild
1974–1979 Eric Heaton
1980–1988 Peter Baelz
1989–2002 John Arnold
2003–2015 Michael Sadgrove
17 July 201625 September 2022 Andrew Tremlett (became Dean of St Paul's

References

Sources
British History – Fasti Ecclesiae Anglicanae 1541–1857, Vol. 11 – Deans of Durham

Deans of Durham
 
Deans of Durham
Durham, England-related lists